Bangsar (or Bank Rakyat-Bangsar for sponsorship reasons) is a light rapid transit (LRT) station on the Kelana Jaya Line located at Bangsar, Kuala Lumpur. It is an elevated station exactly located above Jalan Bangsar. Although it is located at Jalan Bangsar, it is located at quite a distance from most parts of Bangsar, namely Bangsar Baru.

Station Naming Rights Program

Formerly known as Bangsar since its operation on September 1, 1998, the station was renamed to Bank Rakyat-Bangsar after Bank Rakyat was given naming rights by Prasarana Malaysia. It is the first three stations under pilot program of Station Naming Rights since launched in October 2015.

Facilities
There is a facility for reloading the Touch 'n Go card at the Bank Rakyat & Maybank ATM in this station.

Station layout

Bus services
The Bangsar LRT station is well served by bus services, both trunk as well as feeder bus services. The bus stops located at street level and serve many routes, especially those between Kuala Lumpur and the western Klang Valley townships of Petaling Jaya, Shah Alam and Klang.

Trunk buses

Feeder buses

EXPRESS bus routes
FirstCoach, an express bus service to Singapore departs from Lengkok Abdullah, nearby the LRT station.

Gallery

References 

Kelana Jaya Line
Railway stations opened in 1998